Fernando da Conceição Cruz (born 12 August 1940) is a Portuguese former professional footballer who played as a left-back.

Club career
Born in Lisbon, Cruz was already first choice with Benfica at the age of 20, going on to win eight Primeira Liga championships with the club as well as four Portuguese Cups. He played in all five European Cup finals the side reached in the 60s, winning the 1961 and 1962 editions and appearing in 346 official games during his 11-year stint (one goal).

Cruz ended his professional career in June 1971, after one year with newly-formed Paris Saint-Germain. After leaving France he headed to South America, and later to the United States, working as a manager in the latter nation.

International career
Cruz played 11 matches for Portugal, his first appearance being on 21 May 1961 in a 1–1 friendly draw with England. He was included in Otto Glória's squad for the 1966 FIFA World Cup finals, failing to make an appearance for the third-placed nation.

Personal life
Cruz was a supporter of Benfica. In 2008, he was honoured by the club for his achievements, in the presence of his friend and well-known footballer Eusébio.

On 23 September 2012, Cruz acted as "honour guest" of Benfica's supporters association in Canas de Senhorim in the Central Region of Portugal.

Honours
Benfica
Primeira Liga: 1959–60, 1960–61, 1962–63, 1963–64, 1964–65, 1966–67, 1967–68, 1968–69
Taça de Portugal: 1961–62, 1963–64, 1968–69, 1969–70 
European Cup: 1960–61, 1961–62; runner-up: 1962–63, 1964–65, 1967–68
Intercontinental Cup runner-up: 1961, 1962

Paris Saint-Germain
Division 2: 1970–71

Portugal
FIFA World Cup third-place: 1966

References

External links

1940 births
Living people
Footballers from Lisbon
Portuguese footballers
Association football defenders
Primeira Liga players
S.L. Benfica footballers
Ligue 2 players
Paris Saint-Germain F.C. players
UEFA Champions League winning players
Portugal international footballers
1966 FIFA World Cup players
Portuguese expatriate footballers
Expatriate footballers in France
Expatriate soccer players in the United States
Portuguese expatriate sportspeople in France
Portuguese expatriate sportspeople in the United States
Portuguese football managers
Portuguese expatriate football managers
Expatriate soccer managers in the United States